An Antane Kapesh (1926–2004), who also went by the French name Anne(-Marie) André, was an Innu writer and activist from Schefferville, Quebec. She was a chief at Schefferville (Matimekosh) from 1965–1967.

In 1976, she published the autobiographical book Je suis une maudite sauvagesse/Eukuan nin matshimanitu innu-iskueu ("I am a damned savage woman") in a bilingual French-Innu edition. This book, which deals with topics such as loss of hunting territory, the residential school system and police brutality, may have been the first French-language book published by a First Nations woman in Quebec. The publication of books such as this, containing Innu text, has also been cited as an important factor in the cultural revival of the language; an Innu-language press (Éditions Innu) was soon founded and existed until 1993.

Kapesh followed this book with another, Tante nana etutamin mitassi? / Qu'as-tu fait de mon pays? ("What have you done with my country?") in 1979, discusses colonization of Turtle Island from the perspective of a fictionalized child. In 1981 it was adapted for stage production by Kapesh and Jose Maillot (who also translated her first novel into French). Although her writings would be an inspiration to subsequent Innu writers, they were not well received at the time of publication. According to the publisher, Bernard Assiniwi, Je suis une maudite sauvagesse brought on a negative reaction from the reading public and subsequent planned volumes in the series were canceled.

See also
 Maria Campbell
 Harold Cardinal

References

External links
 An Antane-Kapesh, écrivaine (1926-2004) (link in French)

Innu people
First Nations women writers
20th-century First Nations writers
Canadian women non-fiction writers
20th-century Canadian non-fiction writers
Canadian autobiographers
20th-century Canadian women writers
Women autobiographers
First Nations activists